Ira William McCollum Jr. (born July 12, 1944) is an American lawyer and Republican Party politician. He was a member of the United States House of Representatives from 1981 to 2001, representing Florida's 5th congressional district, which was later redistricted to the 8th congressional district in 1993. As a member of the House, McCollum rose to become Vice Chairman of the House Republican Conference, the fifth-highest ranking position in the House Republican leadership. He voted to impeach President Bill Clinton and subsequently took a leadership role in managing Clinton's trial in the Senate, which ended in acquittal.

McCollum was the Republican nominee for the United States Senate in 2000, hoping to replace the retiring Republican Connie Mack III, losing to Democratic nominee Bill Nelson. McCollum ran for the Republican nomination for the U.S. Senate again in 2004 but lost to Mel Martínez. In 2006 he was elected Florida Attorney General and in 2010 he was an unsuccessful candidate for the Republican nomination for Governor of Florida, losing to businessman Rick Scott.

Early life
Born and raised in Brooksville, Florida, McCollum graduated from Hernando High School and earned his bachelor's degree and J.D. degree from the University of Florida. While at the University of Florida, he was inducted into the University of Florida Hall of Fame, the most prestigious honor a student leader could receive, was a member of The Board, and served as president of Florida Blue Key.

McCollum's professional career began in 1969 with the United States Navy's Judge Advocate General Corps where he served on active duty until 1972. McCollum was an officer for more than 23 years before retiring from the United States Naval Reserve as a Commander (O-5) in the JAG Corps in 1992.  In 1973, he entered private practice in Orlando and became involved in local politics, serving as Chairman of the Seminole County Republican Party from 1976 to 1980.

Congressional career

In 1980 McCollum was elected to the U.S. House of Representatives from a district including Walt Disney World and most of Orlando.  He defeated incumbent Representative Richard Kelly in the Republican primary.

While in Congress, McCollum founded the House Republican Task Force on Terrorism and Unconventional Warfare, chairing it for six years. He also served three terms on the House Permanent Select Committee on Intelligence, two of which as Chairman of its Subcommittee on Human Intelligence, Analysis, and Counterintelligence. Additionally, McCollum served as Vice Chairman of the House Banking Committee and served on the Judiciary Committee, where he was Chairman of the Subcommittee on Crime.

While serving the House, McCollum was also selected for a variety of Republican leadership positions, including three terms as Vice Chairman of the House Republican Conference.  McCollum gained national attention as one of 15 members selected to serve on the House Committee to Investigate the Iran-Contra Affair, and, in 1998–1999, as one of the House managers (prosecutors) in the impeachment trial of President Bill Clinton.

U.S. Senate elections
Rather than seek reelection to the House in 2000, McCollum ran unsuccessfully for an open United States Senate seat, bringing to an end his 20-year Congressional career.

McCollum ran again in 2004, seeking the Republican nomination for the U.S. Senate seat being vacated by retiring Senator Bob Graham. He was defeated in the Republican primary by HUD Secretary Mel Martinez, who went on to win the seat.

McCollum served as a partner with the Baker & Hostetler LLP law firm, practicing in the federal policy area. In addition to his duties as the state's chief legal officer, he serves as President and Chairman of the Healthy Florida Foundation, chartered in 2002 to find consensus on long-term solutions to the nation's health care system. He is a member of the North Florida Committee on Foreign Relations. He is also a board member of the James Madison Institute.

Florida Attorney General

In 2006, McCollum ran for Florida Attorney General, defeating State Senator Skip Campbell in the general election.

McCollum led a group of Attorneys General in filing a lawsuit challenging the constitutionality of Obamacare.  He also filed a brief in support of  Arizona's immigration law.

McCollum opposed the federal Stimulus bill, as well as the $20 billion federal oil fund that limited his office's ability to pursue claims against BP, and requested additional authority from the federal government to address Medicaid fraud.

While Attorney General, McCollum defended Florida's ban on adoptions by homosexuals from a lawsuit, In re: Gill, that challenged the ban.  McCollum hired Dr. George Rekers, a controversial clinical psychologist, to testify during the trial that heterosexual parents provide a better environment for children.  The trial resulted in the overturning of the ban.  When an appellate court upheld the lower court ruling, McCollum declined to appeal the case to the Supreme Court.

McCollum was also the Florida Chairman for the Rudy Giuliani presidential campaign in 2008.

2010 gubernatorial candidacy 

On May 18, 2009, McCollum announced his candidacy for Governor of Florida. The election determined the successor of Charlie Crist who later lost his bid for a seat in the U.S. Senate.

McCollum opposed federal health care mandates in Florida, decrying them as an unconstitutional "tax on living," and joined with 13 other state attorneys general in filing a federal lawsuit. The majority of Florida voters opposed such a lawsuit according to polling in April 2010. He has advocated a state constitutional amendment that would opt Florida out of Washington mandates on health care, although questions about whether such an amendment would be constitutional have been raised. On September 8, 2009 McCollum said he supported Medicare and Medicaid programs but opposed a government-run 'public option' for health insurance.

On August 24, 2010, McCollum lost the Republican primary election to Rick Scott.

Private sector
In 2014, McCollum was named to the board of directors of AML Superconductivity & Magnetics, a privately held company that develops magnet-based and superconducting applications, located in Melbourne, Florida.

Personal life
McCollum is married to Ingrid Seebohm McCollum. They have three sons: Douglas, Justin, and Andrew.

See also
 Joe Jacquot (McCollum's Deputy Attorney General and chief of staff)

References

External links

 Bill McCollum, official profile, Office of the Attorney General of Florida
 Bill McCollum, official campaign site
 
 Campaign contributions at OpenSecrets.org (2004 Senate race)
 

|-

|-

|-

|-

|-

|-

1944 births
20th-century American lawyers
20th-century American naval officers
20th-century American politicians
21st-century American lawyers
21st-century American politicians
American Security Council Foundation
Candidates in the 2000 United States elections
Candidates in the 2004 United States elections
Candidates in the 2010 United States elections
Florida Attorneys General
Fredric G. Levin College of Law alumni
United States Navy Judge Advocate General's Corps
Living people
Military personnel from Florida
People associated with BakerHostetler
People from Brooksville, Florida
Republican Party members of the United States House of Representatives from Florida
University of Florida alumni
Members of Congress who became lobbyists